Enzo Todisco (born 22 April 1980) is a former footballer who last plays as forward for FC Gossau in the 1. Liga Classic. He used to play for FC St. Gallen and FC Schaffhausen in the Super League, which is the highest Swiss Professional League.

External links

football.ch 

Italian footballers
Swiss men's footballers
Living people
Association football forwards
1980 births
FC St. Gallen players
FC Vaduz players
FC Gossau players
FC Schaffhausen players
Swiss expatriate footballers
Expatriate footballers in Liechtenstein
Italian expatriate footballers
Italian expatriate sportspeople in Liechtenstein
Swiss expatriate sportspeople in Liechtenstein
Sportspeople from St. Gallen (city)